Natur may refer to:

Natur, Ardabil, Iran
Natur (Israeli settlement)